The PECA Ordinance is an ordinance which states that the exemption for PEMRA licensed TV channels has been abolished in the Electronic Crimes Act 2016, after which fake information about any person on television. News or ridicule can also be considered an electronic crime.

References

External Links
 The Prevention of Electronic Crimes Act, 2016 - National Assembly of Pakistan

Internet censorship in Pakistan